Idanthyrsus is a genus of marine polychaete worms in the family Sabellariidae with 29 recognized species.

Species 
Species in Idanthyrsus include:
 Idanthyrsus albigenus
 Idanthyrsus armatopsis
 Idanthyrsus australiensis
 Idanthyrsus bicornis
 Idanthyrsus bihamatus
 Idanthyrsus boninensis
 Idanthyrsus cretus
 Idanthyrsus kornickeri
 Idanthyrsus luciae
 Idanthyrsus macropaleus
 Idanthyrsus manningi
 Idanthyrsus mexicanus
 Idanthyrsus nesos
 Idanthyrsus okinawaensis
 Idanthyrsus okudai
 Idanthyrsus pennatus
 Idanthyrsus saxicavus
 Idanthyrsus sexhamatus
 Idanthyrsus valentinei
 Idanthyrsus willora
 Idanthyrsus abyssalis
 Idanthyrsus armatus
 Idanthyrsus bihamata
 Idanthyrsus glaessneri
 Idanthyrsus ornamentatus
 Idanthyrsus pennata
 Idanthyrsus quadricornis
 Idanthyrsus regalis
 Idanthyrsus varians

References 

Sabellida